Paralomis dawsoni is a species of king crab which lives in New Caledonia, New Zealand, and the Solomon Islands at depths of . It is the largest species of Paralomis in New Zealand.

Etymology 
The species name "dawsoni" is dedicated to Elliot Watson Dawson of the National Museum of New Zealand.

References 

King crabs
Crustaceans described in 2001
Marine crustaceans of New Zealand
Fauna of New Caledonia
Fauna of the Solomon Islands
Crustaceans of the Pacific Ocean